Canadian war cemeteries are sites for burial for Canadian military personnel for conflicts since 1867. Most of the graves are for the dead in World War I and World War II, but some are for conflicts since 1945.

Most are found abroad (mainly in Europe) and a few within Canada. Most are public cemeteries and many shared with other countries (some with the Commonwealth of Nations, usually administered by the Commonwealth War Graves Commission {CWGC}).

Europe
 Belgium
 Adegem Canadian War Cemetery
 Florenville Cemetery
 Saint Mary Cemetery
 Cyprus
 Dhekelia Cemetery
 Denmark
 Copenhagen Cemetery
 England
Brookwood Cemetery
 Cliveden 
 Cheadle-Gatley 
 Farnborough 
 Gosport
 Hebburn 
 Helston 
 Langar 
 North Luffenham 
 Portland, Dorset - Royal Naval Cemetery
 Radcliffe-On-Trent 
 Seaton 
 St. Merryn 
 Wallasey-Wirral
 France
 Adanac Military Cemetery, Courcelette - World War I
 Ars-laquenexy 
 Bayeux War Commonwealth War Graves Commission Cemetery, Bayeux - World War II 
 Bény-sur-Mer Canadian War Cemetery, Bény-sur-Mer - World War II
 Bistroff 
 Bretteville-sur-Laize Canadian War Cemetery, Bretteville-sur-Laize - World War II
 Canada Cemetery, Tilloy-lez-Cambrai - World War I
 Canadian Cemetery No. 2, Pas-de-Calais  - World War I
 Choloy 
 Dieppe Canadian War Cemetery, Dieppe - World War II
 Givenchy Road Canadian Cemetery, Pas-de-Calais - World War I
 Le Vigan 
 Lelling 
 Marville 
 Metz 
 Piennes 
 St. Avold
 Y Ravine Commonwealth War Graves Commission Cemetery, Beaumont-Hamel - World War I
 Germany
 Arnsberg
 Durnbach 
 Dörlinbach 
 Hannover 
 Iserlohn 
 Karlsruhe 
 Kippenheim 
 Kuppenheim 
 Lahr 
 Rheinburg British War Cemetery 
 Rheindalen 
 Rheinmünster-Söllingen 
 Werl 
 Willstatt 
 Zweibrücken
 Italy
 Agira - World War II
 Cagliari
 Moro River Ortona
 Villanova
 Netherlands
 
 Holten
 Nijmegen
 Groesbeek Canadian War Cemetery - World War II
 Northern Ireland
 Belfast City
 Scotland
 Arbroath 
 Glasgow 
 Lossiemouth

Asia
 Hong Kong
 Sai Wan War Cemetery - World War II
 Stanley Military Cemetery - World War II
 South Korea
 United Nations Memorial Cemetery

 North America

 Canada
 Beechwood Cemetery - Ottawa, Ontario
 Notre Dame Cemetery - Ottawa, Ontario
 Brookside Cemetery - Winnipeg, Manitoba

References

See also 

 Commonwealth War Graves Commission

Canadian military memorials and cemeteries
Military history of Canada
Cultural heritage of Canada